Lyudmyla and Nadiia Kichenok were the defending champions, but Nadiia Kichenok chose not to participate.

Lyudmyla Kichenok played alongside Andreja Klepač, and successfully defended her title, defeating Duan Yingying and Yang Zhaoxuan in the final, 6–3, 6–3.

Players

Draw

Final

Lily group

Bougainvillea group
{{3TeamRR-TennisWide
| title-1=
|title-2=RR W–L
|title-3=Set W–L
|title-4=Game W–L
|title-5=Standings

| seed-1=2
| team-1-abbrev=

References

External links
Doubles Draw

WTA Elite Trophy
WTA Elite Trophy
2019 in Chinese tennis